August Wisbon (born September 11, 1989), known by DJ Roc, is an American DJ and record producer. He is perhaps best known for his music being featured in numerous TV shows and films, including Arrow, The Eric André Show, Jersey Shore, Rich Kids of Beverly Hills and The Smurfs 2.

His songs have also gained popularity on YouTube, with his channel garnering over 20,000 subscribers and 3 million views.

Discography

Singles

Albums

References

1989 births
Living people
Musicians from Albuquerque, New Mexico
Musicians from New Mexico
American house musicians
Record producers from New Mexico
American DJs
Businesspeople from Albuquerque, New Mexico
Electronic dance music DJs